Alhassan "Lalas" Abubakar (born December 25, 1994) is a Ghanaian professional footballer who plays as a centre-back for Major League Soccer club Colorado Rapids.

Early life
Born in Kumasi, Abubakar was raised in the Ghanaian capital of Accra and attended the University of Ghana. He participated in the football team at the university and in 2013, after one of his teammates was selected to join the Dayton Flyers program in the United States, Abubakar was also offered to join after his friend recommended him. Despite having a couple offers in Europe, Abubakar decided to attend the University of Dayton in Ohio and play college soccer for the Flyers.

Dayton Flyers
During his three seasons with the Dayton Flyers, Abubakar appeared in 61 matches, scoring four goals and earned six assists. During the 2015 season, Abubakar won the A-10 Championship with Dayton, and made it to the second round of the NCAA Tournament. In 2016, Abubakar was named the Defensive Player of the Year, and was also named in the A10 Men's Soccer All-Conference First Team.

Club career

Charlotte Eagles and Michigan Bucks

During the college soccer offseason, Abubakar played for Premier Development League club Charlotte Eagles. The team went undefeated during the 2015 season. Abubakar was named in the Eastern Conference team of the season, and was a finalist for the PDL's Young Player of the Year award, losing out to Timothy Mueller. The next season, in 2016, Abubakar joined the Michigan Bucks. Appearing in 17 matches, Abubakar helped the Bucks win the Premier Development League title, featuring in the final against Calgary Foothills on 6 August, a 3–2 victory. Following the season, Abubakar was named the PDL Defender of the Year. and was also named in the All-League Team.

Columbus Crew SC
On 13 January 2017, Abubakar was drafted by Columbus Crew SC in the first round of the 2017 MLS SuperDraft, and the fifth pick overall. During his first season in Columbus, Abubakar split time with Columbus and the Pittsburgh Riverhounds in what is now the USL Championship. In total, Abubakar made 15 appearances; ten with Columbus and five with Pittsburgh. He scored his first professional goal on 19 August 2017 during a 1–1 draw against Orlando City.

During the 2018 season, Abubakar played in 23 matches, scoring one goal.

Abubakar made one appearance for the Columbus Crew in 2019 before being loaned to the Colorado Rapids in exchange for $125,000 in 2019 Targeted Allocation Money

Colorado Rapids (loan)
During the 2018 season, despite Abubakar's uptick in appearances, his performances were largely considered inconsistent and he was relegated to a reserve role for newly appointed Columbus Crew coach, Caleb Porter for the 2019 season. Owing to this, and Columbus's depth in the center-back position, Abubakar was loaned out to fellow Major League Soccer club, the Colorado Rapids. Abubakar appeared in 22 matches for the Rapids, earning the team's Defender of the Year award and helping the club to make a late season playoff push that ultimately fell short.

Colorado Rapids
Following the 2019 season, on November 20, 2019, Abubakar was permanently traded to the Colorado Rapids in exchange for $400,000 in General Allocation Money and a 2020 international roster spot. He made his debut as a permanent member of the Rapids on February 29 in their opening match against D.C. United. Starting next to Drew Moor, Abubakar helped the Rapids to a 2–1 away victory. On 9 September, Abubakar scored his first goal for the Rapids, a late second half stoppage-time equalizer against the Houston Dynamo to draw the game 1–1. Abubakar finished his first season with the Rapids with 18 appearances, all starts, and the one goal. He also earned the Colorado Rapids Defender of the Year award for the second consecutive season.

On 15 December 2020, Abubakar signed a new contract with the Colorado Rapids, keeping him at the club until through 2024. He scored his second goal for the club on 21 July 2021, an opening goal in the 48th minute, as the Rapids won 2–0 at home against FC Dallas. He then opened the scoring again for the Rapids on 14 August in a 3–1 away victory against the Houston Dynamo.

International career
Abubakar has been called up to represent Ghana at the under-20 level.

Career statistics

References

External links
 

Living people
1994 births
Ghanaian footballers
Footballers from Kumasi
Association football central defenders
Dayton Flyers men's soccer players
Charlotte Eagles players
Flint City Bucks players
Columbus Crew draft picks
Columbus Crew players
Pittsburgh Riverhounds SC players
Colorado Rapids players
Colorado Rapids 2 players
USL League Two players
Major League Soccer players
USL Championship players
MLS Next Pro players
Ghanaian expatriate footballers
Ghanaian expatriate sportspeople in the United States
Expatriate soccer players in the United States